Netaji Subhas Road (abbreviated as N. S. Road), previously known as Clive Street, is an important thoroughfare in Central Kolkata that runs predominantly north to south in the B. B. D. Bagh neighborhood of Kolkata.

Name
The road is named after Netaji Subhas Chandra Bose, a leader of the Indian independence movement. Previously, the road was known as Clive Road, after Robert Clive, the first British Governor of the Bengal Presidency.

Thoroughfare
It starts near the GPO of Kolkata and crosses Canning Street, in a major market and then another arterial road Brabourne Road (near the Brabourne Road Flyover) and further up intersects with another arterial road, MG Road, where it ends. Strand Road along Hooghly river runs parallel to Netaji Subhas Road, which lies on its east side.

Landmarks

The road has quiet a few number of buildings, which are remainders of British Raj era and are fine piece of Victorian style of architecture.
There are quite a few important landmarks on this road, such as:-
 General Post Office Building, the head post office of Kolkata.
 Reserve Bank of India Building, which houses the Eastern Zonal Office of Reserve Bank of India.
 Western side of Writer's Building, the seat of Government of West Bengal.
 Lal Dighi, the huge square shaped lake-cum-park, which forms the B. B. D. Bagh is on one side of road.
 Standard Chartered Building.
 Gillander House.
 Security House.
 Exchange House.
 McLeod House.
 Grindlays Bank Building - once head office of Grindlays Bank.
 Marshall House.
 Allahbad Bank Building - Head office of Allahabad Bank.
 Jessop House -the ex-head office of Jessop & Company now used by Government of West Bengal.
 Gupta Mansion Market.
 Coal Bhawan - Registered office of Coal India Limited.
 Duncan House - a large colonial building, once the seat of British conglomerate Duncan Brothers now registered office of RPG-Duncan Group.
 Balmer Lawrie House - Head office of Balmer Lawrie.
 Collectorate Office.
 Fairlie Place, the headquarters of Eastern Railway, a large complex which spreads to Strand Road on other end, originally built by erstwhile East Indian Railway.

All most all major banks of India have their main or commercial branch on this road - like - Bank of India, Central Bank of India, Allahabad Bank, Standard Chartered Bank, The Hongkong and Shanghai Banking Corporation, Punjab National Bank, Punjab & Sind Bank, HDFC Bank, ICICI Bank, Axis Bank, UCO Bank, Bank of Baroda, State Bank of India, Oriental Bank of Commerce, Indian Overseas Bank, Vijaya Bank, Federal Bank, IDBI Bank, United Bank of India, TamilNadu Mercantile Bank, Kotak Mahindra Bank, State Bank of Bikaner & Jaipur, Central Bank, Syndicate Bank, Bank of Maharashtra.

Apart from above, the other important government offices on Netaji Subhas Road are Election Commission, Panchayat & Rural Development Department, Office Of The Custodian Of Enemy Property For India, National Jute Manufactures Corporation, West Bengal Agro Industries Corporation, West Bengal State Rural Development Agency, Excise Collectorate, Public Works Department Engineering Division.
 

Apart from that being in the road being in center of Kolkata's business hub most of corporate, insurance companies including Unit Trust of India have either their main or liaison or branch offices in and around Netaji Subhas Road.

Markets
Netaji Subhas Road is the main market area for machinery and other equipments like pumps, motors, diesel engines, pipes, bearings, agricultural equipments, hardware & paints.

Also further, down along the Netaji Subhas Road between Brabroune Road and MG Road lies the main scrap market or metal market of Kolkata.

The road ends at MG Road in the Burrabazar area.

The Calcutta Stock Exchange is located at Lyons Range, hardly few meters away off the Netaji Subhas Road just behind Writer's Building.

Transportation
All buses that ply though B.B.D. Bagh, stop near General Post Office Building located along Netaji Subhas Road.
 
The B.B.D. Bagh tram and bus terminus of Calcutta Tramways Company is also located on one side of Netaji Subhas Road just opposite to Writer's Building.

Operation
The road is one-way directional throughout the day. During first half of the day up coming traffic is allowed to come and during evening hours as the shops and offices close, the down traffic is allowed. However, some part of it is maintained as totally one-way and some as two-directional throughout the day. Traffic resurrections are lifted after 9:00 pm till 6:00 am every day.

Traffic

As there is Writer's Building alongside it, there are always a number of policeman and traffic police to control and ease the traffic at any part of day. Therefore, even during peak hours the traffic flows with ease at Netaji Subhas Road. Public transport and private vehicles are not allowed to stop on this road for long for security reasons.

References

External links
 Netaji Subhas Road on Wikimap

Roads in Kolkata
Central business districts in India
Memorials to Subhas Chandra Bose